CTRL (Chinese: 操控) is a Singaporean drama produced and telecast on Mediacorp Channel 8. It stars Desmond Tan, Ya Hui, Denise Camillia Tan, Elvis Chin and Richie Koh.

Main Cast 

 Desmond Tan as Zhou Zhiping 周志平 : Zhou created the hacker team "Zero".
 谢颖泽 as the younger version of Zhou
 Ya Hui as Liang Siyun
 吴委恩 as the younger Liang
 Denise Camillia Tan as Du Enzhe
 Richie Koh as Huang Xuezhong 
 Guo Liang as Liang Wendao
 Adele Wong as Mrs Liang
 Bernard Tan as Wang Renhai
 Zen Chong as He Shaoguang
 Darren Lim as He Shaoqiang

References

2020s Singaporean television series
2021 Singaporean television series debuts
Mediacorp Chinese language programmes